Corn Creek is an unincorporated community and census-designated place in Mellette County, South Dakota, United States. Its population was 113 as of the 2020 census. The community is located near the intersection of South Dakota Highway 44 and South Dakota Highway 63.

Geography

Demographics

References

Unincorporated communities in Mellette County, South Dakota
Unincorporated communities in South Dakota
Census-designated places in Mellette County, South Dakota
Census-designated places in South Dakota